Ahmad Tasnim Fitri bin Mohd Nasir (born 11 January 1999) is a Malaysian professional footballer who plays as a left-back for Malaysia Super League club Kelantan United.

Honours
Malaysia U19
 AFF U-19 Youth Championship: 2018; runner-up: 2017

References

External links
 

1999 births
Living people
Malaysian footballers
People from Kelantan
People from Kota Bharu
Felda United F.C. players
Negeri Sembilan FA players
Sarawak United FC players
Kelantan United F.C. players
Malaysia Super League players
Malaysian people of Malay descent
Association football defenders